is an action role-playing platform video game developed by Hudson Soft for the Nintendo Entertainment System. The name was licensed by computer game developer Nihon Falcom ("Falcom") and was developed and released in Japan by Hudson Soft for the Famicom in 1987. Nintendo released the game in the United States and Europe as a first-party title under license from Hudson Soft.

Faxanadu is a spin-off or side-story of Xanadu, which is the second installment of Falcom's long-running RPG series, Dragon Slayer. The title Faxanadu is a portmanteau formed from the names Famicom and Xanadu.

The game uses side-scrolling and platforming game-play, while employing role-playing elements with an expansive story and medieval setting.

Story
The player-controlled protagonist of Faxanadu is an unnamed wanderer who returns home. He has no name, though the Japanese version allows the player to choose one. The game begins when he approaches Eolis, his hometown, after an absence to find it in disrepair and virtually abandoned. Worse still, the town is under attack by Dwarves. The Elven king explains that the Elves' fountain water, their life source, has been stopped and all other remaining water has been poisoned and provides the protagonist with 1500 gold, the game's currency, to prepare for his journey to uncover the cause.

As the story unfolds, it is revealed that Elves and Dwarves lived in harmony among the World Tree until The Evil One emerged from a fallen meteorite. The Evil One then transformed the Dwarves into monsters against their will and set them against the Elves. The Dwarf King, Grieve, swallowed his magical sword before he was transformed, hiding it in his own body to prevent The Evil One from acquiring it. It is only with this sword that The Evil One can be destroyed.

His journey takes him to four overworld areas: The tree's buttress, the inside of the trunk, the tree's branches and finally the Dwarves' mountain stronghold.

Gameplay

Faxanadu is a side scrolling action role playing game, sometimes classified as a metroidvania. Players guide the hero through a screen-by-screen series of fields, towns, and dungeons. The hero can walk, jump, and climb ladders – all typical characteristics of a platform game. Along the way, he may also purchase usable items with gold, equip and use bladed weapons against enemies, equip armor, and cast magic projectiles. In addition, he can access information regarding the game's events by speaking with townsfolk or by consulting other sources.

The limits of physical damage the hero can sustain from enemies is tracked by a life bar, and the magical power he can exert is tracked by a magic bar. These are listed on the top of the screen along with total experience, total gold, time (for items with a timed duration), and the currently held item.

When the hero defeats an enemy, it usually leaves behind gold or life-giving bread, and the hero gains a set amount of experience. Experience points help increase the hero's rank. Occasionally, an enemy will also drop an item, some of which activate specific effects when touched and some of which can be stored for later use.

The game utilizes a password system. Passwords, or "mantras" as they are known in the game, can be obtained from church-dwelling Gurus. Gurus also bestow ranks to the hero when he meets certain experience totals; these determine the amounts of experience and gold a player will possess upon resuming a game via password.

Because of its use of statistics, reliance on story, thematic basis upon medieval fantasy, and provision of interactive NPCs, many observers have classified Faxanadu as a role-playing video game.

Development
Jun Chikuma composed the music for the game and was assisted by Hudson Soft's sound programmer, Toshiaki Takimoto. Chikuma, working with just the tone generator of the NES which had only three channels, used her background in jazz technique to create melodic movements and express chord progression. The team gave her full freedom "from general directions to sound-making details. I was able to work quite freely under these good circumstances.”

Release 
Faxanadu was released in Japan on the Famicom on November 16, 1987. It was released in North America in August 1989 and was published by Nintendo as part of a deal with Hudson Soft, thus later starting a collaboration on their Mario Party series. The November/December 1989 edition of Nintendo Power, Faxanadu debuted on the magazine's "Top 30" list at #6. It gradually fell from the list in subsequent issues.

The game world is featured in two episodes of Season 2 (1990–1991) of the Nintendo-based, Saturday morning cartoon series, Captain N: The Game Master. They are "The Feud of Faxanadu" and "Germ Wars". The Elven King is named Melvis and looks and sounds like Elvis Presley for his first appearance; the voice was changed in the latter episode. The Dwarf King is not featured and is replaced by Queen Dwarfine.

The game was eventually released on the Wii's Virtual Console in 2010 and 2011.

Reception

The game has received critical acclaim. Weekly Famitsu scored it 29 out of 40. IGN reviewed the game in 2011, after its Wii virtual console release, giving it a better score of 8.5 out of 10 and called it a hidden gem. IGN went on to call it a better action RPG than Zelda II: The Adventure of Link and Castlevania II: Simon's Quest.

Marcel van Duyn of Nintendo Life gave the game an 8 out of 10, saying that it is a surprisingly fun game and an absolutely essential purchase for those who like RPGs. However, he criticized the password system for western audiences, and was grateful the Virtual Console release eliminates that feature. Retro Gamer listed the game as the 16th best game for the NES, saying it is a "forgotten gem" of the system's library. IGN listed the game as the 36th best NES game, calling it "one of the best and least-known Nintendo-published adventures.

Notes

References

External links
 

Role-playing video games
Action role-playing video games
Dragon Slayer (series)
Nintendo games
Hudson Soft games
Nintendo Entertainment System games
Side-scrolling role-playing video games
Virtual Console games
1987 video games
Metroidvania games
Video games developed in Japan
Video games scored by Jun Chikuma
Single-player video games